Siranush Ghukasyan (born 25 November 1998) is an Armenian chess player who holds the FIDE title of Woman International Master (WIM, 2017). She is a three-time Armenian Women's Chess Championship medalist (2017, 2018, 2019).

Biography
Ghukasyan won Armenian Youth Chess Championship in various girl's age groups: 2008 (U10), 2010 (U12), 2012 (U14), 2014 (U16). In 2013, she also won silver medal in U16 age group. Siranush Ghukasyan participated in European Youth Chess Championships and World Youth Chess Championships. She won medals in Armenian Women's Chess Championship: 2 silver (2017, 2018) and bronze (2019).

She played for Armenia in the Women's Chess Olympiad:
 In 2018, at reserve board in the 43rd Chess Olympiad (women) in Batumi (+2, =4, -0).

Ghukasyan played for Armenia in the World Women's Team Chess Championship:
 In 2019, at reserve board in the 7th Women's World Team Chess Championship in Astana (+1, =0, -4).

She played for Armenia in the European Women's Team Chess Championship:
 In 2019, at second board in the 22nd European Team Chess Championship (women) in Batumi (+1, =1, -3).

In 2017, Ghukasyan received the FIDE Woman International Master (WIM) title.

References

External links
 
 
 

1998 births
Living people
Sportspeople from Yerevan
Armenian female chess players
Chess Woman International Masters
Chess Olympiad competitors
20th-century Armenian women
21st-century Armenian women